Transport in the Maldives includes, road, water and air. The country has no railways.

Road
All roads in the capital city of Malé are paved with concrete cobblestones. Many of the roads in Addu city are paved with tarmac. A small highway in Addu is called "the link road". A causeway connects 3  islands.

Ports and harbors
Gan, Malé, is the local port authority.

Merchant marine

Total
16 ships (1,000 GT or over) total 66 804 GT/.

Ship types
As of 2005 ships number 12 cargo, 1 passenger/cargo, 2 petroleum tanker and 1 refrigerated cargo 1,

Foreign registry
As of 2005 2 ships were registered in Panama.

Air
The archipelago had 11 airports. Two had paved runways. Another covered .

See also
List of airports in Maldives
Flyme
Maldivian
Mega Maldives
Trans Maldivian Airways

References

External links